HD 133981, also known as HR 5628, is a solitary, bluish-white hued star located in the southern circumpolar constellation of Apus. It has an apparent magnitude of 6.02, allowing it to be faintly visible to the naked eye in ideal conditions.

HD 133981 has a stellar classification of B8 IV, indicating that it is a B-type star that is evolving towards the red giant branch. Houk and Cowley (1975) gave a slightly more evolved class of B8/9 III, instead indicating that it is a giant star. Some evolutionary models show that it is a star just reaching the end of the main sequence. Nevertheless, it has 3.72 times the mass of the Sun and 6.35 times its girth. HD 133981 is said to be 202 million years old.

HD 133981 lies in front of the distant faint galaxy LEDA 54288. A debris disk has been detected around the star.

References

Apus (constellation)
B-type giants
133981
5628
074421
CD-72 01096
Apodis, 25